San Francisco is a combined city/county in the U.S. state of California.

San Francisco may also refer to:

Places within San Francisco, California 
 San Francisco Bay
 San Francisco Bay Area, the metropolitan area
 San Francisco Peninsula, the peninsula where the city is located
 University of San Francisco, a Jesuit university located in the city
 San Francisco State University, a public university part of the CSU System
 Mission San Francisco de Asís, the Spanish mission which was the first European settlement in the city

Other places

Argentina
 San Francisco, Córdoba

Chile
 San Francisco Glacier
 San Francisco de Mostazal

Colombia
 San Francisco, Antioquia
 San Francisco, Cundinamarca
 San Francisco, La Guajira
 San Francisco, Putumayo

Costa Rica
 San Francisco de Dos Ríos District, San José Canton

Dominican Republic
 San Francisco de Macorís

Ecuador
 San Francisco de Quito, formal name of the capital city

Honduras
 San Francisco, Atlántida
 San Francisco, Lempira
 San Francisco de Opalaca, Intibucá
San Francisco de Yojoa, Cortes

Guatemala
 San Francisco, El Petén
 San Francisco El Alto, Totonicapán
 San Francisco Zapotitlán, Suchitepéquez

Mexico
 San Francisco de Campeche
 San Francisco de los Romo, Aguascalientes
 San Francisco del Mezquital, Durango
 San Francisco Coacalco, State of Mexico
 San Francisco Cahuacúa, Oaxaca
 San Francisco Cajonos, Oaxaca
 San Francisco Chapulapa, Oaxaca	
 San Francisco Chindúa, Oaxaca
 San Francisco del Mar, Oaxaca	
 San Francisco Huehuetlán, Oaxaca	
 San Francisco Ixhuatán, Oaxaca
 San Francisco Jaltepetongo, Oaxaca
 San Francisco Lachigoló, Oaxaca
 San Francisco Logueche, Oaxaca
 San Francisco Nuxaño, Oaxaca
 San Francisco Ozolotepec, Oaxaca	
 San Francisco Sola, Oaxaca	
 San Francisco Telixtlahuaca, Oaxaca
 San Francisco Teopan, Oaxaca
 San Francisco Tlapancingo, Oaxaca
 San Francisco, Nayarit
 San Francisco Tetlanohcan, Tlaxcala

Nicaragua
 San Francisco de Cuapa

Panama
 San Francisco, Panamá
 San Francisco, Veraguas

Philippines
 San Francisco, Agusan del Sur
 San Francisco, Cebu
 San Francisco, Quezon
 San Francisco, Southern Leyte
 San Francisco, Surigao del Norte
 San Francisco, San Pablo, Laguna
 San Francisco, Bohol

Spain
 San Francisco (Bilbao)
 Sant Francesc Xavier, Formentera, Balearic Islands

United States
 San Francisco, Old San Juan, a sector within the township of Old San Juan in the capital of San Juan, Puerto Rico
 San Francisco, Minnesota, an abandoned town
 Mission San Francisco de Potano, a Spanish mission to the Timucua Indians of Florida
 Mission San Francisco Solano (California), a Spanish mission in Sonoma, California
 San Francisco Peaks, a set of mountains in Arizona
 San Francisco Plantation House, a historic plantation near New Orleans
 San Francisco volcanic field, Arizona; includes above peaks
 La Villa Real de la Santa Fé de San Francisco de Asís (the original Spanish name of Santa Fe, New Mexico)
 San Francisco, Colorado, a small town at the foot of the Sangre de Cristo Mountains

Venezuela
 San Francisco de Yare, Miranda
 San Francisco de Yuruaní, Bolivar

Popular culture 
 San Francisco (magazine), a monthly publication dedicated to arts and culture in the San Francisco Bay Area

Games
 Driver: San Francisco, a video game
 San Francisco convention, a contract bridge bidding convention

Film
 San Francisco (1936 film), a 1936 film set in the city, about the events surrounding the 1906 San Francisco earthquake
 San Francisco (1968 film), a 1968 pioneering impressionistic documentary film directed by Anthony Stern

Music

Albums
 San Francisco (American Music Club album), 1994
 San Francisco (Bobby Hutcherson album), 1971
 San Francisco (Fleurine album), 2008

Songs
 "San Francisco" (Cascada song), 2011
 "San Francisco (Be Sure to Wear Flowers in Your Hair)", by Scott McKenzie, 1967
 "San Francisco (You've Got Me)", by the Village People, 1977
 "Theme from San Francisco", from the 1936 film, later popularized by Judy Garland
 "San Francisco", by 808 State from ex:el, 1991
 "San Francisco", by Jill Sobule from California Years, 2009
 "San Francisco", by Midicronica, featured in the series Samurai Champloo, 2005
 "San Francisco", by the Mowgli's, 2012
 "San Francisco", by Niall Horan from Heartbreak Weather, 2020
 "San Francisco", by Tor Endresen, representing Norway at Eurovision  1997

Sports 
San Francisco 49ers, a professional American football club located in Santa Clara, California, but retains the name San Francisco, having played in the city from 1946 to 2013
San Francisco City FC, an American amateur soccer club located in San Francisco, California
San Francisco Dons, the nickname of the athletic teams at the University of San Francisco
San Francisco F.C., a Panamanian football club located in La Chorrera, Panamá
San Francisco Giants, a professional baseball club located in San Francisco, California

Transportation 
 The City of San Francisco (train), a passenger train
 The San Francisco Chief, a passenger train
 USS San Francisco, the name of several vessels of the United States Navy
 San Francisco station, a Tren Urbano station in Puerto Rico
 San Francisco (Madrid Metro), on Line 11, Madrid, Spain
 San Francisco (Mexibús, Line 1), a BRT station in Tecámac, Mexico
 San Francisco (Mexibús, Line 2), a BRT station in Coacalco de Berriozábal, Mexico
 San Francisco 4th and King Street station, a commuter station in San Francisco, California
 San Francisco metro station (Quito), Ecuador

Other uses 
 San Francisco (decorative typeface), an Apple font for Macintosh computers up to Mac OS 7
 San Francisco (sans-serif typeface), another font by Apple for its devices and as its corporate typeface
 San Francisco, the Orange U.K. model of the ZTE Blade smartphone
 San Francisco System, a bilateral alliance network pursued by the United States in East Asia, after the end of the World War II

See also 
 San Francisco Cathedral (disambiguation)
 San Francisco shooting (disambiguation)
 St. Francis (disambiguation), the English equivalent of San Francisco
 São Francisco (disambiguation), the Portuguese equivalent of San Francisco
 List of places named after Saint Francis
 San Cisco
 "San Frandisco", a 2020 song by Dom Dolla